Lobeliomyia is a genus of flies belonging to the family Lesser Dung flies.

Species
L. scotti Richards, 1951

References

Sphaeroceridae
Diptera of Africa
Brachycera genera